Giustino (Giustin in local dialect) is a comune (municipality) in Trentino in the northern Italian region Trentino-Alto Adige/Südtirol, located about  northwest of Trento.

Giustino borders the following municipalities: Vermiglio, Pinzolo, Spiazzo, Strembo, Carisolo, Caderzone, Massimeno, Stenico and Comano Terme.

Demographic evolution

References

Cities and towns in Trentino-Alto Adige/Südtirol